Pacific MusicWorks is an opera company in Seattle, Washington that stages performances of baroque opera ranging from full theatrical productions to chamber concerts. The group was founded in 2008, as Pacific OperaWorks, by Stephen Stubbs.

See also
 Seattle Opera

References

External links
 official website

American opera companies
Music of Seattle
Musical groups established in 2008
2008 establishments in Washington (state)